Abū’l-Ḥasan ʻAlī ibn Ismāʻīl, known as Ibn Sīdah, or Ibn Sīdah'l-Mursī, (c.1007-1066), was a linguist, philologist and lexicographer of Classical Arabic from Andalusia.  He compiled the encyclopedia (Book of Customs) and the Arabic language dictionary Al-Muḥkam wa-al-muḥīt al-aʻẓam (The Great and Comprehensive Arbiter".  His contributions to the sciences of language, literature and logic were considerable.

Ibn Sīdah was born in Murcia in eastern Andalusia. The historian Khalaf ibn ʻAbd al-Malik Ibn Bashkuwāl (1183-1101) in his book  (Book of Relations) gives Ismāʻīl as the name of his father, in agreement with name given in the Mukhassas. However Al-Fath ibn Khaqan in mathmah al-anfus has the name Aḥmad. Yaqut al-Hamawi in The Lexicon of Literature, says Ibn Sīdah ('son of a woman') was his nickname.  Remarkably both he and his father were blind. His father was a sculptor although it seems the disciplines he devoted his life to, philology and lexicography, had been in his family.

Mohammed ibn Ahmed ibn Uthman Al-Dhahabi's biographic encyclopedia  (Lives of The Noble Scholars) is the main biographic source.  He lived in the taifa principality of "Dénia and the Eastern Islands" under the rule of Emir Mujahid al-Amiri al-Muwaffaq (1044-1014) and he travelled to Mecca and Medina.  He studied  in Cordova under the renowned grammarian Abu al-Sa'ad ibn al-Hasan al-Rubai al-Baghdadi (أبو العلاء صاعد بن الحسن الربعي البغدادي) (d.417AH/1026AD) exiled in Andalusia, and with Abu Omar al-Talmanki (أبي عمر الطلمنكي)(429-340AH). He died in Dénia.

Works
al-Mukhaṣṣaṣ 'Allowance' (20 vols)
Al-Muḥkam wa-al-muḥīt al-ʾaʿẓam (Beirut, 2000); Arabic dictionary, 11 vols.  A principal source for the famous Lisān al-ʿArab dictionary by the great thirteenth-century lexicographer Ibn Manzur.
al-muḥkam wa al-muḥīṭ ul-ʾaʿẓam 'The Great Comprehensive Reference'

al-ʾunīq 'The Elegant'
šarʿ ʾiṣlāḥ al-Muntaq 'Commentary on the Reform of Logic'
šarʿ ma ʾaškāl min shaʿr al-Mutanabbī 'Commentary on Forms of al-Mutanabbi (al-Kindi)'s Poems' 
al-ʿalām fi l-luġa ʿala al-ʾaǧnās  'Science of Languages of Nations'
al-ʿālam wa l-Mutaʿallam  'Knowledge and the Student'
al-Wāfī fi ʿalam ʾaḥkām al-Quwāfī 'Science of Rhyme Provision'
al-ʿawīs fi sharʿ ʾIslāḥ l-Munṭaq 'Sharp Explanation of Logic'
šarʿ Kitāb al-ʾAḫfash 'Commentary on Book of the Hidden'
as-samāʾ wa l-ʿālam 'Heaven and Earth'
al-ʿālam fi l-Luġah 'Philology'
šawāḏ al-Luġah 'Language Lovers'
Al-Muḥkam wa l-Muḥīt al-ʾAʿẓam 'The Great and Comprehensive Arbitrator'.

References

1000s births
1066 deaths
11th-century historians from al-Andalus
11th-century biographers
11th-century lexicographers
11th-century non-fiction writers
Al-Andalus encyclopedists
Arab biographers
Arab grammarians
Arab lexicographers
Blind writers
Medieval grammarians of Arabic
Encyclopedists of the medieval Islamic world
People from Córdoba, Spain
People from Murcia